Us Again may refer to:

 "Us Again" (song)
 Us Again (film)